Euaspidoceras babeanum is an extinct ammonoid-cephalopod species that lived during the Jurassic period.

Fossils of Euaspidoceras babeanum may be found in the Upper Jurassic, Oxfordian stage of France, around 154 to 146 million years ago.

Description

References

Jurassic ammonites
Aspidoceratidae